Princess Patricia's Canadian Light Infantry (PPCLI, generally referred to as the Patricia's) is one of the three Regular Force infantry regiments of the Canadian Army of the Canadian Armed Forces. Formed in 1914, it is named for Princess Patricia of Connaught, daughter of the then-Governor General of Canada. The regiment is composed of three battalions, for a total of 2,000 soldiers. The PPCLI is the main lodger unit of Canadian Forces Base (CFB) Edmonton in Alberta and CFB Shilo in Manitoba, and attached to 3rd Canadian Division; as such, it serves as the "local" regular infantry regiment for much of Western Canada. The Loyal Edmonton Regiment (LER), a Reserve Force battalion, is affiliated with the PPCLI but is not formally part of it. As part of this affiliation, the LER carries the designation '4th Battalion, Princess Patricia's Canadian Light Infantry'.

The regiment is a ceremonial structure, and the three battalions are independent operational entities, under the 1 Canadian Mechanized Brigade Group (1 CMBG). Although the regimental name includes the phrase light infantry, two of its battalions are mechanized infantry, and the unit has never been organized as a traditional light infantry regiment.

The PPCLI was raised on the initiative of Captain Andrew Hamilton Gault in 1914, to participate in the Canadian war effort for the First World War. It was the first Canadian infantry unit to enter the theatre of operations, arriving in France on December 21, 1914. The regiment has also participated in the Second World War, the Korean War and the War in Afghanistan, as well as in numerous NATO operations and United Nations peacekeeping missions. The regiment has received 39 battle honours, three Commander-in-Chief Unit Commendations and the United States Presidential Unit Citation.

Structure 
The regiment is composed of three battalions, all of which are Regular Force units and part of the 1 Canadian Mechanized Brigade Group (1CMBG). Each battalion is a distinct operational entity in the Canadian Forces' order of battle. The two first battalions are mechanized infantry, while the third one is light infantry. The regimental headquarters are located on CFB Edmonton.

1st Battalion 
The 1st Battalion, Princess Patricia's Canadian Light Infantry (1PPCLI) is located at Steele Barracks, CFB Edmonton, Alberta. 1 PPCLI is a mechanized infantry battalion of the Regular Force and uses the LAV 6.0 (light armoured vehicle) as its primary fighting vehicle. The battalion is made of three rifle companies, combat support company comprising reconnaissance and signals platoons as well as a sniper group, and administration company. The current commander is Lieutenant-Colonel J.D. Schaub, CD Its regimental sergeant-major (RSM) is Chief Warrant Officer R.J. Crane, MMM, MMV, CD.

2nd Battalion 
The 2nd Battalion, Princess Patricia's Canadian Light Infantry (2PPCLI) is based at Kapyong Barracks in CFB Shilo, Manitoba. The battalion is a mechanized infantry unit of the Regular Force and is part of the 1CMBG. The battalion is composed of three rifle companies (A, B and C), one combat support company, and one command and administration company. Each rifle company is made of three platoons and a headquarters element, and has 15 LAV 6.0 infantry fighting vehicles. The combat support company is composed of a reconnaissance platoon and a signals platoon. The current battalion commander is Lieutenant-Colonel M.J. Reekie, MMV, CD. Its Regimental Sergeant Major (RSM) is Chief Warrant Officer B. Perry, MMM, CD

3rd Battalion 
The 3rd Battalion Princess Patricia's Canadian Light Infantry (3PPCLI) is based at Steele Barracks, CFB Edmonton, Alberta. The battalion is a light infantry unit of the Regular Force, and the only one in Western Canada. The battalion is composed of three rifle companies, one combat support company and one combat service support company. 3PPCLI also maintains an airborne and mountain operations capability. The commanding officer (CO) is Lieutenant-Colonel J.C. Thamer, CD The regimental sergeant major is Chief Warrant Officer L.J. Schnurr, CD.

Lineage

The Princess Patricia's Canadian Light Infantry 
Princess Patricia's Canadian Light Infantry originated in Ottawa, Ontario on 10 August 1914. The Permanent Active Militia (Regular Force) component was formed on 1 April 1919 and the Canadian Expeditionary Force component of the regiment was disbanded on 30 August 1920.

Following the Second World War on 1 March 1946, the Canadian Active Service Force regiment was disbanded and the 2nd Battalion, Princess Patricia's Canadian Light Infantry, CIC was redesignated Princess Patricia's Canadian Light Infantry, CIC. On 27 June 1946, the regiment was embodied in the post-war Permanent Force (Active Force).

On 7 August 1950, the 2nd Battalion, Princess Patricia's Canadian Light Infantry, RCIC was authorized to be formed as an Active Force unit embodied in the Special Force. On 1 January 1952, it ceased to be embodied in the Canadian Army Special Force.

On 30 November 1950, the 3rd Battalion, Princess Patricia's Canadian Light Infantry, RCIC was authorized to be formed as an Active Force unit embodied in the Special Force. On 1 November 1953, it ceased to be embodied in the Canadian Army Special Force. On 8 January 1954, it was reduced to nil strength and the battalion was disbanded on 21 July 1954. On 27 April 1970, the 3rd Battalion, Princess Patricia's Canadian Light Infantry was authorized to be formed as a Regular Force unit.

Lineage chart 
Lineage of the units of Princess Patricia's Canadian Light Infantry:

Perpetuations
On 3 November 1997, the regiment was granted the perpetuation of the 260th Battalion Canadian Rifles, Canadian Expeditionary Force (Siberia).

History

Early history and First World War (1914–1919) 
At the outbreak of World War I, when Canada was lacking regular military forces, the then-Captain Andrew Hamilton Gault raised the Patricias. Hamilton Gault offered $100,000 to finance and equip a battalion to participate in the Canadian war effort overseas. The government temporarily accepted his offer on August 6, 1914, and officially authorized it on August 10. The Department of Militia and Defence contributed to the equipment of the unit. The charter of the regiment was signed on August 10, and the Governor General of Canada, The Duke of Connaught and Strathearn, approved the creation of the regiment.

A sandstone slab memorial at Lansdowne Park is dedicated to the founding of Princess Patricia's Canadian Light Infantry at this location in August 1914.

Lieutenant-Colonel Francis D. Farquhar was instrumental in assisting Hamilton Gault in founding the regiment. Colonel Farquhar, Military Secretary to Canada's Governor General, asked the Duke of Connaught for permission to name the regiment after his daughter, Princess Patricia of Connaught. She was pleased to accept this honour and thus Princess Patricia's were established. "Light Infantry" in the battalion name was chosen by Captain Gault, who served during the Second Boer War and liked the impression of an irregular force that the name inspired.

Farquhar and Gault moved expeditiously to mobilize the regiment. The day after authority was granted, August 11, the two men began an aggressive recruitment campaign. Due to the patriotic outpouring following the August 4 declaration of war, 3,000 applicants were recruited within eight days. By August 19 a full complement of 1,098 had been selected, of those, 1,049 had previously served in South Africa or in the British Army. Farquhar became the first commander of the battalion. The regiment's first formal parade was conducted on August 23 in Ottawa, during which Princess Patricia presented the regimental standard. Princess Patricia, Colonel-in-Chief, designed and made by hand the regimental flag to be presented on that occasion. It is a crimson flag with a circular royal blue centre. In the circle are gold initials "V P", which stands for Victoria Patricia. The regimental standard became known as the "Ric-A-Dam-Doo". This flag was carried in every regimental action during World War I. It was not officially adopted as a regimental colour and consecrated as such until after the First World War.As a Canadian regiment mobilized in a time of wartime shortages, the regiment was equipped with weapons from a variety of sources. Private soldiers initially carried the Canadian .303 Ross rifle, while officers and non-commissioned officers normally carried the 1914 Colt Canadian-contract .45 M1911 pistol.

The regiment left Ottawa on August 28 and boarded the SS Megantic in Montreal, Quebec. However, because of enemy action in the Atlantic Ocean, the regiment had to deboard at Lévis, Quebec. During the period of training at Lévis, following extensive tests on the Ross rifle, the Patricias issued the first of what would be many damning reports of the suitability of the Ross rifle for combat. The regiment finally left on September 27 from Quebec City on board the Royal George for England in company with the rest of the first Canadian contingent.

Upon arrival at their camp on the Salisbury Plain, England on October 18 the regiment was first stationed at Bustard Camp near Stonehenge. On November 16 the unit joined the 80th Brigade of the British Expeditionary Force at Winchester. At that time the regiment abandoned the troubled Ross rifle in favour of the British Lee–Enfield. On 20 December, the regiment departed for the port of Southampton with the rest of the brigade and embarked for France arriving the next day. On this date the PPCLI was the only Canadian infantry unit on the battlefield; only the 1st Canadian Medical Corps was there before.

The Patricias first took their place in the trenches on January 6, 1915, at a location known to the British Army's soldiers as "Dickiebush".

When Farquhar was killed in action at St Eloi on March 20, he was replaced by Lieutenant-Colonel H. Buller, another British regular, who had served with him on the staff of the governor general before the war.

On May 8, the stout defence of Bellewaerde Ridge during the Battle of Frezenberg established the reputation of the Patricias but at tremendous cost. When they came out of the line the 700 men that had started the battle had been reduced to just 150 who were battle ready. The tattered remains were commanded by a lieutenant, all other officers having been killed or wounded. The phrase "holding up the whole damn line" became one of unit's unofficial mottos for the regiment.

The PPCLI served for a year with the 80th Brigade before joining the new 7th Brigade within the 3rd Canadian Division on December 22. In 1916 the regiment fought major battles at Mount Sorrel and on the Somme. It was not until October 1916 that the first Canadian, Lieutenant-Colonel Agar Adamson, was appointed to command the regiment. In 1917 as part of the Canadian Corps, the regiment took part in the Battle of Vimy Ridge on April 9, and Passchendaele later the same year. In 1918 the regiment fought at the Battle of Amiens, Jigsaw Wood, and the Battle of the Canal du Nord as part of the great battles of the Hundred Days that ended the war. The 4th Company PPCLI entered Mons with other Canadian troops early on November 11, before the armistice took effect at 11 am.

During the Battle of Passchendaele Sergeant George Harry Mullin earned the Victoria Cross, the highest honor in the British Empire. Sergeant Robert Spall won the regiment's second Victoria Cross at Parvilliers on August 12 and 13, 1918.

A former Patricia, Lieutenant Hugh McKenzie, who had risen from private to company sergeant-major before accepting his commission and transferring to the Canadian Machine Gun Corps, was awarded the Victoria Cross posthumously for his actions during Passchendaele. He had already won the Empire's second-highest award for gallantry, the Distinguished Conduct Medal, while serving with the regiment as well as the French Croix de Guerre. On 30 October 1917, he was a member of the 7th Canadian Machine Gun Company, Canadian Machine Gun Corps, leading a section of four machine guns in support of the regiment. Seeing that one of the PPCLI companies was hesitating to advance in the face of a German machine gun position on dominating ground, he handed command of his troops to an NCO and went to rally the men of his old regiment. McKenzie organized an attack and captured the enemy position. Once on the position, however, he realized that it was itself under dominating enemy machine gun fire from a nearby pillbox. McKenzie organized parties to capture the pillbox by making both frontal and flanking attacks. He was killed while leading the frontal attack. When the awarded of his Victoria Cross was announced in the London Gazette on 12 February 1918, his surname was misspelled as "Mackenzie."

On February 4, 1915, Private Guy Dwyer became the Patricias' first combat casualty of the war 
The last of the Patricias killed in action was likely Corporal Percy Wainwright Carleton on 10 November 1918. In total 1,272 officers and enlisted men of the Patricias were killed and 82 officers and enlisted men were captured during the war.The 260th Battalion, Canadian Rifles, CEF (Siberia) was authorized on 1 November 1918 in Victoria, B.C. and embarked for Russia on 29 December 1918. It served with the 16th Infantry Brigade as part of the Allied Forces in eastern Russia until 9 May 1919. The battalion was disbanded on 15 November 1920. The service of the 260th Battalion, CEF (Siberia) resulted in Princess Patricia's Canadian Light Infantry being awarded the battle honour .

Between the wars (1918–1939) 
On March 20, 1919, the regiment became a component of the Permanent Active Militia. In 1920 the regimental headquarters, A Company and D Company were relocated to Fort Osborne Barracks, in Winnipeg, Manitoba, while B Company relocated to Esquimalt, British Columbia. The period between the two wars was a recession period for the Canadian Armed Forces, and the regiment lost 209 soldiers in 1924.

In 1926 a group of officers and friends of the PPCLI erected a plaque in the chapel of a women's monastery on Echo Drive, across the Rideau Canal from Lansdowne Park which was dedicated to the memory of the war dead and veterans of the PPCLI during the First World War. It was moved to St. Clement Chapel, Albion Road in 1985, then to St. Clement's new premises at 87 Mann Avenue in 1993.

Second World War (1939–1945) 

World War II began in Europe on September 1, 1939, and the Parliament of Canada declared war between Canada and Germany on September 10, 1939. The same day, the Patricias were mobilized for active service. The regiment recruited in Winnipeg and Vancouver until October. The regiment sailed from Halifax, Nova Scotia on the December 21, 1939, arriving in Aldershot, England, as part of the 2nd Brigade of the 1st Canadian Infantry Division under the command of Lieutenant-Colonel W.G. Colquhoun. They spent New Year's Eve in Cove, west of Farnborough. On February 10, 1940, the colonel-in-chief, Princess Patricia, inspected her regiment for the first time in twenty-one years. The regiment spent three and a half years in United Kingdom, most of which was spent in coastal defence and training in various parts of the country.

On July 10, 1943, the PPCLI, forming part of the 1st Canadian Infantry Division and the British Eighth Army, landed in Sicily during Operation Husky. The Patricia won its first battle honours of the Second World War at Leonforte. Later, on September 4, 1943, the regiment landed and fought in Italy, advancing North for two months. The unit was slowed down by the demolished bridges and the German rear guard. In December 1943 the regiment fought during the Moro River Campaign; that year the soldiers spent Christmas in Ortona.

In May 1944 the PPCLI took part in the offensive against the Hitler Line, west of Monte Cassino, during the allied offensive against Rome. At that point the regiment was a component of the newly formed I Canadian Corps. In August the unit took part in the offensive against the Gothic Line and in the assaults on San Fortunato and Rimini.

On March 13, 1945, the I Canadian Corps was transferred to Northwest Europe where it joined the First Canadian Army and took part in the liberation of the Netherlands. Shortly after, the regiment captured the city of Apeldoorn, and, on May 7, 1945, it was the first allied force to enter Amsterdam, under the command of Lieutenant-Colonel Clark.

On June 1, 1945, a new battalion of the regiment was authorized to be part the Canadian Pacific Force in the campaign against Japan. Its official designation was 1st Canadian Infantry Battalion, Princess Patricia's Canadian Light Infantry, 2nd Canadian Infantry. After the destruction of Hiroshima and Nagasaki by American atomic bombs and Japan's subsequent surrender on August 15, 1945, the Pacific Force was disbanded. On September 2, the new battalion was renamed 2nd Battalion, Princess Patricia's Canadian Light Infantry, Canadian Infantry Corps and became a component of the interim force, waiting for the formation of a permanent force.

In October 1945, the regiment's serving battalion in Europe, understrength, returned to Winnipeg and was demobilized.

After the war (1945–1950) 
After the war, in January 1946, while the interim force was gradually disbanded and the permanent force was formed, the 2nd Battalion returned to CFB Shilo. On June 10, it was relocated to Calgary, Alberta. On March 1, 1947, the battalion was renamed from 2nd Battalion, Princess Patricia's Canadian Light Infantry, Canadian Infantry Corps to 2nd Battalion, Princess Patricia's Canadian Light Infantry.

In 1948, on the eve of the Korean War, an emphasis was put on the airborne troops and the 2nd Battalion was the first unit chosen to fill this role, on a voluntary basis. In the end, all the members of the unit, including the officers, became paratroopers; training was completed in the spring of 1949.

Korean War (1950–1954) 
On August 15, 1950, the 2nd Battalion was created within the regiment to be a component of the Canadian Army Special Force in response to the North Korean invasion of South Korea; the unit adopted the designation of 2nd Battalion, Princess Patricia's Canadian Light Infantry. The new battalion trained in Calgary and at CFB Wainwright, in Alberta, before boarding the USS Private Joe P. Martinez on November 25, 1950, to Pusan in South Korea. The battalion landed in Korea in December and trained in the mountains for eight weeks before finally taking part in the war on February 6, becoming a component of the 27th British Commonwealth Brigade of the IX American Corps in the 8th US Army. The 2nd Battalion of the PPCLI was the first Canadian infantry unit to take part in the Korean War.

On April 22, 1951, Chinese forces undertook a major offensive against the United Nations forces and pierced through the first line of defence held by the 6th South Korean Division. During the Battle of Kapyong the 2nd Battalion, PPCLI, the 3rd Battalion, Royal Australian Regiment, and A Company, 72nd Heavy Tank Battalion (US) were tasked with the defence of the Kapyong Valley. The formation delayed the Chinese forces for three days while United Nations forces withdrew to a new defensive line, thus saving Seoul. For their action, these three units received the United States Presidential Unit Citation and the Republic of Korea Presidential Unit Citation.

On May 25, 1951, the 2nd Battalion, PPCLI was transferred to the 25th Canadian Infantry Brigade within the 1st Commonwealth Division. In the fall, the 2nd Battalion was replaced by 1PPCLI and returned to Calgary. Meanwhile, in Canada, a new battalion was created on November 30, 1950. This 3rd Battalion trained at CFB Wainwright, CFB Borden, and Camp Ipperwash, before sending troops with the 1st and 2nd Battalions during their tour in Korea.

The 3rd Battalion replaced the 1st Battalion in the fall of 1952, and occupied Hill 355 until late November 1952. After three months of active service the battalion was disbanded on February 8, 1954. The PPCLI was again reduced to two battalions, and the commander, regimental sergeant major, and members of the disbanded 3rd Battalion were chosen to form the new 2nd Battalion of the Canadian Guards.

Service in Canada and Germany (1950–1988) 
In the spring of 1950 the 1st Battalion supported civil authorities responding to floods in Manitoba.

From 1950 to 1969, Canada, as a NATO member, maintained a brigade-group in Germany. The 2nd Battalion, PPCLI served in Germany from October 1953 to the fall of 1955, when the 1st Battalion replaced it until the fall of 1957. In the fall of 1963 the 1st Battalion deployed for its second rotation until 1966. The 2nd Battalion returned in July 1984 for four years. In 1994 CFB Lahr in Germany closed, effectively ending the Canadian rotations.

Cold War and peacekeeping (1968–2003) 

The 1st Battalion, Princess Patricia's Canadian Light Infantry was sent to Cyprus in 1968 within the United Nations Peacekeeping Force in Cyprus (UNFYCIP). Different infantry units including the two PPCLI battalions then undertook six-month rotations in the country until 1993. PPCLI completed 12 tours in Cyprus.

In 1970 the 1st Battalion of The Queen's Own Rifles of Canada was based in Victoria, British Columbia. Due to a reorganization, its members were rebadged to the newly recreated 3rd Battalion, Princess Patricia's Canadian Light Infantry. The regiment also increased in size when the Canadian government closed 4 Canadian Mechanized Brigade Group.

The sculpture Anti-Tank Patrol by André Gauthier was commissioned to mark the 75th anniversary of the regiment in 1989.

The Patricias served in Israel, Golan, Egypt, Lebanon, Kuwait, Iraq, Nigeria, Uganda, Congo, Vietnam, Central America, Angola, Somalia, Rwanda, Korea, Croatia, and Bosnia, for various missions.

During the Yugoslav Wars in the early 1990s, soldiers from PPCLI served in the United Nations Protection Force (UNPROFOR), the United Nations peacekeeping force in Croatia. In the autumn of 1992 The 3rd Battalion replaced the Royal 22nd Regiment in Sector North, stationed out of Camp Polom, near Pakrac. The 22nd had actually spent much of their six-month tour out of position. They were with General Lewis MacKenzie, securing the Sarajevo airport for UN relief shipments.  It was replaced by a battle group of 875 members mostly from the 2nd Battalion PPCLI in 1993. The battle group was dispatched to the Medak Pocket in September 1993 to interpose themselves between Serb and Croatian forces. After the Croatians opened fire on the PPCLI troops, they became involved in an intense firefight. In 2002 Colonel Jim Calvin and his men were awarded the Commander-in-Chief Unit Commendation for their bravery. A battle group drawn mostly from 1st Battalion PPCLI replaced the 2nd in 1994; the 2nd Battalion also served with the stabilization force in 1997, 2000 and 2003, the 3rd Battalion in 2000, and the 1st Battalion in 2002 and 2003. B Company, 1st Battalion, deployed as part of Lord Strathcona's Horse (Royal Canadians) Battle Group to northwest Bosnia from July 1997 to January 1998. Elements of PPCLI served with Lord Strathcona's Horse during the 1917–1918 winter, and in 1999, the 1st Battalion sent a complete battle group to the Kosovo Force.In the spring of 1997, the 1st Battalion supported civil authorities with the Manitoba floods yet again. In 1998, it was again mobilized, this time to respond to the 1998 North American ice storm in Quebec.

In 1998 to celebrate the announcement of the re-opening of Canada House, a detachment of the 3rd Battalion was sent to London to mount the Royal Guard at the Buckingham Palace, a rare honour. The Royal Canadian Regiment had the same honour two years later, at the re-opening.

War in Afghanistan (2001–2010)

Operation Apollo (2002–2003) 
On January 22, 2002, during Operation Apollo, the Canadian contribution to Operation Enduring Freedom and the War in Afghanistan, the 3rd Battalion, Princess Patricia's Canadian Light Infantry, deployed to Afghanistan. The Battlegroup also included a reconnaissance squadron from Lord Strathcona's Horse and support elements from the 1st Service Battalion. These were the first major troops Canada sent in the theatre of operations, only preceded by a small team of Joint Task Force 2 operators in late 2001.

In March 2002, during Operation Anaconda, members of the 3PPCLI were in the Afghan province of Paktiya, clearing the mountains looking for Taliban and members of Al-Qaeda. The Canadian element of the operation, led by the United States, was composed of sixteen soldiers including six snipers. Both shots surpassed the long-standing previous world record of  set by U.S. Marine Gunnery Sergeant Carlos Hathcock during the Vietnam War. The U.S. Army awarded the team members the Bronze Star for their actions in combat. Other Canadian snipers recorded high hit ratios and some extremely difficult shots, but remain anonymous.On March 13, 2002, Operation Harpoon was launched in parallel of Operation Anaconda, with the goal of eliminating a small pocket of Taliban fighters. The operation involved air elements as well as a ground battlegroup composed of Canadian and American soldiers, led by Lieutenant-Colonel Pat Stogran, commander 3PPCLI battlegroup. The next day, a reconnaissance platoon from 3PPCLI led the American troops to a network of caves and bunkers used by Al-Qaeda resisters. The battlegroup proceeded to destroy the bunkers and Operation Harpoon ended on March 19.

After Operation Harpoon, the 3PPCLI returned to Kandahar International Airport, and started training for future operations. On April 18, 2002, the 3rd Battalion was involved in a highly publicized case of friendly-fire (blue on blue). The Canadian soldiers were participating in planned nighttime training exercises near Kandahar when Major Harry Schmidt, an American pilot from the Illinois Air National Guard, flew overhead. Believing he was being fired upon by enemy soldiers, Schmidt dropped one  laser-guided bomb on the soldiers from his F-16. Sergeant Marc Léger, Corporal Ainsworth Dyer, Private Richard Green and Private Nathan Smith were killed instantly and eight were injured. Schmidt was court-martialed by the U.S. and convicted of dereliction of duty as a result, in what became known as the Tarnak Farm incident.On May 4, 2002, Operation Torii is launched, and Lieutenant-Colonel Stogran leads an international task force, of which 400 Canadian soldiers. The goal of the mission was to discover networks of caves used by the Talibans and Al-Qaeda, as well as to gather intelligence in the Tora Bora region.

From June 30 to July 4, 2002, the majority of 3PPCLI relocated to Zabul Province, Northwest of Kandahar, to establish for the first time a coalition presence in the region.

The 3rd Battalion started preparing its redeployment back to Canada on July 13, and its members came back home in two contingents, on July 28 and July 30, after a short stay in Guam. In March 2003, the 1st Battalion, Princess Patricia's Canadian Light Infantry, deployed a 35-soldier platoon to serve alongside already deployed units from Operation Apollo. The platoon was replaced in July by a Royal Canadian Horse Artillery platoon.

Operation Athena (2004–2010) 

From August 2004 to February 2005, during Operation Athena, the 3rd Battalion deployed a reconnaissance platoon with the LdSH (RC) reconnaissance squadron to Kabul. A battlegroup built on 1PPCLI deployed in Kandahar from February to July 2006.

When the 1PPCLI deployed to Afghanistan, the Taliban began a major offensive and the Canadians were caught in the middle. After a spring in which a record number of attacks against Canadian soldiers had been set, and numerous offensives by Canadians which included six deaths to the Canadian Forces, the Taliban in Kandahar and Helmand provinces were massing and Operation Mountain Thrust was launched in the beginning of the summer. Canadians were the leading combatants and the first fighting in the Battle of Panjwaii took place. Complex mud-walled compounds made the rural Panjwaii district take on an urban style of fighting in some places. Daily firefights, artillery bombardments, and allied airstrikes turned the tides of the battle in favour of the Canadians.After Operation Mountain Thrust came to an end, Taliban fighters flooded back into the Panjwaii district in numbers that had not been seen yet in a single area in the post Anaconda war. The Canadian Forces, which came under NATO command at the end of July, launched Operation Medusa in an attempt to clear the areas of Taliban fighters once and for all.

The fighting of Operation Medusa was conducted with a larger force of Canadians, most of them being brand new to combat and largely fought by the rotation replacing the 1PPCLI, a battle group built around the 1st Battalion, Royal Canadian Regiment (RCR).

For their actions in 2006, the 1st Battalion PPCLI Battle Group was given the Commander-in-Chief Unit Commendation from the Governor-General of Canada.

The 2nd Battalion, PPCLI, took over from the 3rd Battalion, Royal 22e Régiment (R22eR) in February 2008. In August of the same year, it is replaced by the 3RCR, and in September 2009, 1PPCLI returns in Afghanistan to replace 2R22eR, where it stayed until May 2010.

Affiliate regiments 
  – The Rifles
  – The Royal Australian Regiment

Battle Honours 
Battle honours are the right given by the Canadian Crown to the regiment to mark on its colours the name of the battles or operations in which they stood out. Princess Patricia's Canadian Light Infantry has received 41 battle honours. Battle honours in all caps were awarded for participation in large operations and campaigns, while those in lowercase indicate honours granted for more specific battles. Those battle honours in bold type are authorized for emblazonment on the regimental colours. Two soldiers of the regiment have been awarded the Victoria Cross, the highest honours of the Commonwealth forces, during World War I.

Battle honours:

Victoria Cross recipients

Recognition
Freedom of the city was exercised by the 3rd Battalion in Victoria, British Columbia on June 15, 1974.
The regiment was granted the Freedom of the City of Edmonton, an honour in respect of the centennial of the regiment. This permits the regiment to conduct parades on city streets as of May 22, 2014.

Bands 

Instead of a regimental band, PPCLI maintains three drum lines that form the regimental corps of drums, which provides ceremonial musical support. It is the Canadian counterpart to the Corps of Drums of the British Army Royal Logistics Corps, and thus it is an all-percussion unit that occasionally marches with the Royal Canadian Artillery Band. From 1919 to 1994 however, PPCLI did maintain a regimental band. PPCLI's band date back to the First World War when its core band came from the St. Mary's Boys Brigade Band and the 140th New Brunswick Battalion in January 1916. PPCLI Band was formed in 1919 under the guidance of Captain Tommy James and was stationed at Fort Osborne Barracks in Winnipeg. In early 1940s, the 1st Canadian Division Band was largely made up of former PPCLI bandsmen, which provided the basis to be reactivated after the war at Wainwright, Alberta. Due to military budget cuts in 1994, the entire band was disbanded and reduced to a corps of drums. The drum line was inactive due to the Afghanistan War in the early 2000s; however, it was re-formed under the leadership of Sergeant Keith Mooney and Warrant Officer Dave Kennedy in 2014. The process for establishment began in 2012 with the research for drum patterns and sequences. The drum line took part in the regimental Centennial Parade in September 2014.

The Edmonton Police Service pipe band, which was formed in 1914, was dissolved during the First World War, with its musicians being re-augmented to PPCLI and leading the regiment into battle. Members of the pipe band also served as stretcher bearers during the war. As a result of this close history together, the Pipes and Drums of the EPS, which was re-founded in 1961, is the only non-military civilian band within the Commonwealth to wear the badges of three Canadian regiments, with one of these being PPCLI. While serving as a public relations tool for the EPS, it performs alongside the regiment during public events in Edmonton. The band was invited to play at PPCLI's beating retreat ceremony in 1964 and at the regimental trooping the colour in 1967.

Traditions 

Since March 17, 2007, the regiment's colonel-in-chief is former Governor-General of Canada Adrienne Clarkson. The previous colonel-in-chief was Countess Mountbatten of Burma, herself succeeding Princess Patricia. This is the first time that a person who is not a member of the Canadian Royal Family has been invited to take such a position with the regiment. The new colonel-in-chief took up her appointment at a ceremony on March 17, 2007, at the Regimental Headquarters in Edmonton.

The PPCLI does not have an official motto; however, their unofficial motto, "First In The Field", is based on the fact that they were the first Canadian unit to deploy in the Great War. The regiment also uses another non-official motto, Once a Patricia, Always a Patricia, which reminds that the regimental family includes retired soldiers and officers and those who transferred elsewhere in the Canadian Forces. March 17 is the most important date within the regiment, as it corresponds to Princess Patricia's birthday. May 8 is the anniversary of the 1915 Battle of Frezenberg and is observed by a parade and a church ceremony. April 25 is the anniversary of the Battle of Kapyong, normally observed by the 2nd Battalion with a parade. On August 10, the regiment celebrates the foundation of the PPCLI in 1914. September 21 is the anniversary of the Battle of San Fortunato in 1944.

The regimental march of Princess Patricia's Canadian Light Infantry consists of the songs "Has Anyone Seen The Colonel?", "It's a Long Way To Tipperary", and "Mademoiselle from Armentières".

Colonels in Chief
 Princess Patricia of Connaught  22 February 191812 January 1974
 The Countess Mountbatten of Burma   15 June 197417 March 2007
 The Rt Hon Adrienne Clarkson    17 March 2007Present

List of colonels of the regiment

Brigadier Andrew Hamilton Gault, OBE, DSO, ED, CD (September 25, 1958 – November 28, 1958)
Major-General Cameron B. Ware, DSO, CD (September 13, 1959 – April 21, 1977)
Major-General George Grenville Brown, CD (April 21, 1977 – July 6, 1983)
Colonel William Benjamin Scott Sutherland, CD (July 6, 1983 – October 14, 1987)
Brigadier-General R. Stuart Graham, CD (October 15, 1987 – October 19, 1990)
Major-General Herbert C. Pitts, MC, CD (October 19, 1990 – July 3, 1994)
Major-General C. William Hewson, CMM, CD (July 3, 1994 – June 24, 2000)
General A.J.G.D. de Chastelain, CC, CMM, CD, CH (June 24, 2000 – June 20, 2003)
Major-General Robert I. Stewart, CMM, CD (June 20, 2003 – August 30, 2006)
Brigadier-General J.E.L. Gollner, OMM, CD, (August 30, 2006 - May 17, 2010)
Lieutenant-General Ray R. Crabbe, CMM, MSC, CD (May 17, 2010 – June 11, 2015)
Major-General W. Brian Vernon, CD (June 11, 2015 – June 15, 2018)
Brigadier-General V.W. Kennedy, OMM, MSM, CD (June 15, 2018 – Present)

The Patrician 
The Patrician is a regimental journal first published in May 1933. In 1946, a monthly paper started publishing, but was suspended during the Korean War. In 1953, The Patrician started publishing twice annually until 1960 when it became annual because of financial restraints. The Patrician adopted its present format in 2003.

Ric-A-Dam-Doo  
Ric-A-Dam-Doo is a nickname for the original camp flag of the PPCLI. Various sources claim that "Ric-A-Dam-Doo" is a presumably phonetic version of the Gaelic for "cloth of thy mother"; but it is not clear that this claim has been confirmed by a Gaelic speaker. The independent companies that preceded the formation of the 42nd Regiment of Foot were known in Scottish Gaelic as Am Freiceadan Dubh, which translates to "The Black Watch" in English.

In 1984, in a conversation with the PPCLI Colonel-of-The-Regiment, Colonel William Sutherland, Lieutenant James MacInnis surmised that the PPCLI's founder, Brigadier Hamilton Gault, a former 'Black Watch' officer from the Canadian Militia, may have used the Gaelic term when referring to the flag and Lt MacInnis believed that subsequent soldiers' bastardization of the Gaelic became accepted practise. The Ric-A-Dam-Doo was hand-sewn by Princess Patricia and presented to the Regiment.

In 2011 Colonel-in-Chief Adrienne Clarkson, asked songwriter Bryan Adams to write a song to commemorate the 100th anniversary of the PPCLI. Together with his songwriting partner Jim Vallance, they composed a song based on the flag called Ric-A-Dam-Doo. It was recorded by the wives of the regiment in Edmonton, Alberta and was released to the public by Universal Records.

Western Hockey League affiliation 
The PPCLI is not directly affiliated with the Western Hockey League, but they are associated through name with the Regina Pats who were formed in 1917 in Regina, Saskatchewan, as a major junior hockey team. The "Patricias" shortened their name to the Regina "Pats" in 1923, and to this day wear the PPCLI patch on their hockey jersey's shoulders. The Regina Pats are the longest lived major junior hockey team in the world.

In popular culture 
In the movie “Across the Pacific”(1942), a cashiered U.S. Army officer, played by Humphrey Bogart crosses the border in 1941 and attempts to enlist in the Princess Pats. He is refused, as the regiment expects all its officers to have high moral standards. The character later comments that his rejection “was a *little* on the insulting side”.

A soldier of the regiment is interviewed in Max Brooks's zombie novel World War Z.
The character Major Patrick Gordon/Patrick Crawley in Season 2 of Downton Abbey was a member of PPCLI.

The Canadian infantry soldiers in the Afghanistan War-based movie Hyena Road are members of the PPCLI.

In 1968 movie "The Devil's Brigade" Sgt. Patrick O'Neill (played by Jeremy Slate) is wearing P.P.C.L.I. insignia on his shoulder.

In the "Ultimate Soldier Challenge" TV show on History channel (Season 1, Episode 5) three teams of two soldiers (US Marines, Canadians, and Contractors) are competing in various military tasks. The Canadians (Alex and Andrija) are from the PPCLI.

Freedoms
The regiment has received the Freedom of several locations throughout its history; these include:

  16 September 1972: Esquimalt.
  15 June 1974: Victoria.
  1985: Ottawa.
  1989: Winnipeg.
  22 May 2012: Brandon.
  10 August 2014: Edmonton.
  15 September 2014: Gibbons.

Arms

Order of precedence

References 

 

 

 and 
 

Other footnotes

Bibliography

External links 
 
 Regimental page on Canadian Army site
 

 Regimental veterans association
 
 1914/11/04-1915/10/31 
 1915/11/01-1916/12/31 
 1917/01/01-1918/03/31 
 1918/04/01-1919/01/31

Princess Patricia's Canadian Light Infantry
Infantry regiments of Canada
Light Infantry regiments of Canada
Infantry regiments of Canada in World War II
Military units and formations of Canada in the Korean War
Military units and formations established in 1914
Organizations based in Edmonton
1914 establishments in Alberta
Battalions of the Canadian Expeditionary Force
Military units and formations of Ontario
Military units and formations of Alberta
Military units and formations of Manitoba
Canada
Recipients of the Presidential Unit Citation (United States)